Willy Focke (born 1949) is a German composer.

Life 
In 1973, Focke received a 3rd prize at the Dresden Weber Competition. In 1976, he was awarded the Hanns Eisler Prize by Radio DDR. In the same year, he received the 1st prize at the Chamber Music Competition of the GDR Music Days. His works are published by Edition Peters and have been performed among others by the String Quartet of the Komische Oper Berlin and at chamber music evenings of the Staatskapelle Dresden.

Work 
 Concerto for Basset Horn and Orchestra
 String Quartet I with Baritone solo on a poem by Johannes R. Becher, op. 13
 String Quartet II
 Fünf Duos für Bratsche und Klarinette, Op. 3.
 Drei Sonette von Francesco Petrarca for one voice and harpsichord.
 Epitaph für Carl Philipp Emanuel Bach, Divertimento for oboe, violoncello and harpsichord
 Und wo die erste Reihe geht (song)

References

External links 
 

20th-century German composers
20th-century classical composers
1949 births
Living people
Place of birth missing (living people)